Bureå is a locality situated in Skellefteå Municipality, Västerbotten County, Sweden with 2,360 inhabitants in 2010. The famous Bure kinship is associated with the locality.

References 

Populated places in Västerbotten County
Populated places in Skellefteå Municipality